Dobrivoje (Cyrillic script: Добривоје) is a masculine given name of Slavic origin. Notable people with the name include:

Dobrivoje Božić (1885–1967), Serbian inventor
Dobrivoje Marković (born 1986), Serbian handballer
Dobrivoje Trivić (1943–2013), Serbian footballer

Slavic masculine given names
Serbian masculine given names